James Alexander McCollum (born 1 August 1995) is an Irish cricketer. He made his international debut for the Ireland cricket team in February 2019. In January 2020, he was one of nineteen players to be awarded a central contract from Cricket Ireland, the first year in which all contracts were awarded on a full-time basis.

Domestic career
He made his first-class debut on 28 March 2017 for Durham MCCU against Gloucestershire as part of the Marylebone Cricket Club University fixtures. Prior to his first-class debut, he played for Northern Knights in the 2016 Inter-Provincial Championship in Ireland.

He made his Twenty20 debut for Northern Knights in the 2017 Inter-Provincial Trophy on 23 June 2017. He made his List A debut for Northern Knights in the 2017 Inter-Provincial Cup on 6 August 2017. He was the leading run-scorer for Northern Knights in the 2018 Inter-Provincial Championship, with 442 runs in four matches.

International career
In December 2018, he was one of nineteen players to be awarded a central contract by Cricket Ireland for the 2019 season. In January 2019, he was named in Ireland's Test and One Day International (ODI) squads for their series against Afghanistan in India. He made his ODI debut for Ireland against Afghanistan on 28 February 2019. He made his Test debut for Ireland against Afghanistan on 15 March 2019.

In June 2019, he was named in the Ireland Wolves squad for their home series against the Scotland A cricket team. On 10 July 2020, McCollum was named in Ireland's 21-man squad to travel to England to start training behind closed doors for the ODI series against the England cricket team. In February 2021, McCollum was named in the Ireland Wolves' squad for their tour to Bangladesh.

References

External links
 

1995 births
Living people
Irish cricketers
Ireland Test cricketers
Ireland One Day International cricketers
Durham MCCU cricketers
Northern Knights cricketers
People from Craigavon, County Armagh